Galela is a genus of planthoppers in the family Fulgoridae: from Indonesia and Western Australia.

References 

Auchenorrhyncha genera
Poiocerinae